Chen Shi-chang (6 May 1934 – 25 December 2014) was a Taiwanese politician.

Chen served on the Huwei Township Council before he was elected to the Yunlin County Council. From 1977 to 1987, he was a member of the Taiwan Provincial Consultative Council, when he was named to the Control Yuan. Chen then served as a member of the Legislative Yuan between 1993 and 1996. He was elected to the fourth National Assembly in 2005.

Chen was diagnosed with esophageal cancer in 2013, but refused treatment. He died of multiple organ failure at home, aged 80, on 25 December 2014.

References

1934 births
2014 deaths
Members of the 2nd Legislative Yuan
Kuomintang Members of the Legislative Yuan in Taiwan
Yunlin County Members of the Legislative Yuan
Taiwanese Members of the Control Yuan
Deaths from multiple organ failure